Podpeč is a settlement in the City Municipality of Koper in the Littoral region of Slovenia.

Mass grave
Podpeč is the site of a mass grave associated with the Second World War. The Vilenica Mass Grave is located in a shaft below a cliff edge, about 500 m south of Praproče. It contains the remains of undetermined victims. The remains that were visible were gathered in 1992 and were reburied in the Koper cemetery in 2004.

Church
A small church in the settlement is dedicated to Saint Helena and belongs to the Parish of Predloka. It has no belfry, but contains some interesting late Gothic frescos.

Fortified tower 

A Venetian fortified tower stands near the village.

References

External links
Podpeč on Geopedia

Populated places in the City Municipality of Koper